This is a list of some of the endowed schools in England and Wales existing in the early part of the 19th century. It is based on the antiquarian Nicholas Carlisle's survey of "Endowed Grammar Schools" published in 1818 with descriptions of 475 schools but the comments are referenced also to the work of the Endowed Schools Commission half a century later. Most English and Welsh endowed schools were at the time described as grammar schools, but by the eighteenth century there were three groups: older prestigious schools becoming known as "public schools"; schools in manufacturing towns that innovated to some extent in syllabus; and more traditional grammar schools in market towns and rural areas.

A medieval grammar school was one which taught Latin, and this remained an important subject in all the schools, which generally followed the traditions of Oxford and Cambridge, from which almost all of their graduate schoolmasters came. Some of the schools listed by Carlisle had long been fee-paying public schools, although in most cases (as at Eton and Winchester) retaining some provision for the teaching of "scholars" who paid reduced or no fees.

An endowment for educational purposes had an original purpose, often intended by the founder or founders to be legally binding, but the objects of such endowments were not always fully honoured by those controlling the schools. Carlisle compiled his list by means of a questionnaire, which was not always answered. The Commission's report built on his research, while not accepting all his claims on the continuity of certain schools from monastic and chantry foundations, which affected the dating of schools. The chronological list in the report has numerous further details of endowments.

There is little consistency in the actual names of grammar schools from this period. Many were called "free schools". Carlisle used some unorthodox spellings, and he listed Hampshire under its alternative historical name of Southamptonshire.

Bedfordshire

Berkshire
For Eton College see Buckinghamshire.

Buckinghamshire

Cambridgeshire

Cheshire

Cornwall

Cumberland

Derbyshire

Devon

Dorset

Durham

Essex

Gloucestershire

Hampshire
For Hampshire see County of Southampton.

Herefordshire

Hertfordshire

Huntingdonshire

Kent

Lancashire

Leicestershire

Lincolnshire

London

Middlesex

Monmouthshire

Norfolk

Northamptonshire

Northumberland

Nottinghamshire

Oxfordshire

Rutland

Shropshire

Somerset

County of Southampton
Carlisle referred to Hampshire as Southampton.

Staffordshire

Suffolk

Surrey

Sussex

Warwickshire

Westmorland

Wiltshire

Worcestershire

Yorkshire

North Wales

South Wales
Monmouthshire is listed separately.

See also
 List of the oldest schools in the United Kingdom
 List of direct grant grammar schools
 Armorial of UK schools

Notes

References

Bibliography 
Nichlas Carlisle, A Concise Description of the Endowed Grammar Schools in England and Wales, Volume 1 and 2 [1818] (2010)

External links
CCEd database schools search
Carlisle, Nicholas (1818). A concise description of the endowed grammar schools in England and Wales
 Volume 1: Bedford–Lincoln
 Volume 2: London–Wales

History of education in England
History of education in Wales
Lists of schools in England
Lists of schools in Wales
Grammar schools in England
Grammar schools in Wales